Aisha Omar Kigoda (born December 26, 1955) is a Member of Parliament in the National Assembly of Tanzania. She has also served as the Deputy Minister for Health and Social Welfare for Tanzania since 2006.

Biography 
Kigoda attended AMO Training School in 1985 where she received an Advanced Diploma in Clinical Medicine.

In 2007, Kigoda was the Chair of the Parliamentary Committee on Economic Affairs.

References 

Living people
Members of the National Assembly (Tanzania)
1955 births